She Shoots Straight (alternately Lethal Lady) is a 1990 Hong Kong action film directed by Corey Yuen and starring Sammo Hung and Joyce Godenzi.

Story 
She Shoots Straight turns on three plot axes. The first concerns the complications of a workplace romance and marriage between a dedicated policewoman “Mina Kao” (Joyce Godenzi) and her supervisor “Huang Tsung-pao” (Tony Leung). The second theme concerns opposition by the Huang family to the couple's impending union. Another policewoman, Mina's future sister-in-law “Chia Ling” (Carina Lau) is especially critical of apparent favoritism, and even makes a remark about her being Eurasian (this is not unique – a comparable epithet being made by Oshima's character to her guy opponent in “Close Escape”). The third axis provides a resolution as a gang of Vietnamese led by Yuan Hua (Yuen Wah) attempts a violent and risky robbery. After the gang is thwarted, a shootout ensues in which the police get the upper hand. Swearing revenge, Yuan Hua lays a counter-trap using Vietnamese jungle warfare devices. When Chia Ling – slighted over disciplinary action – impulsively investigates alone, she risks trouble. Mina and Tsung Po rescue her, but he is killed by a booby trap, dying in front of his sister and bride. United in their grief, the women must break the news to the Huang family at a celebration for their matriarch. This paves the way for a relatively straightforward vengeance sub-plot in which Mina and Chia Ling track the gang to a freighter in the harbor. In advance of reinforcements, they board the vessel to fight a life or death duel against gang members and crew wielding pistols, hatchets, knives or tools.

Cast
Joyce Godenzi - Inspector Mina Kao (as Joyce Mina Godenzi)
Carina Lau - Huang Chia-Ling
Sammo Hung - Supt. Officer Hung
Tony Leung Ka-Fai - Insp. Huang Tsung-Pao
Yuen Wah - Yuen Hua
Agnes Aurelio - Yuen Ying
Sarah Lee - Huang Chia-Lai
Teddy Yip - Uncle Huang Tsung-Po
Chung Fat - Hua
David Lau - Superintendent Lau
Stephen Chan - Arms dealer  
Corey Yuen - Boatman
Cho Wing - Ship Thug
Anthony Carpio - Ship Thug
Hsu Hsia - Ship Thug
Michael Dinga - Kidnapping Leader
Jeff Falcon - Kidnapper
Mark Houghton - Kidnapper
Kam Kong Chow - Policeman
Bill Tung
Deon Lam
Wan Faat
Ken Goodman
Bruce Fontaine

External links 
 http://hkmdb.com/db/movies/view.mhtml?id=7286&display_set=eng
 http://www.hkcinemagic.com/en/f454-She-Shoots-Straight.html

 https://m.imdb.com/title/tt0099809/?ref_=nm_flmg_t_66_act

1990 films
Hong Kong martial arts films
1990s Cantonese-language films
1990 martial arts films
Girls with guns films
Films directed by Corey Yuen
1990s police films
1990s Hong Kong films